The Roman Catholic Diocese of Rio Branco is a Latin suffragan see in the ecclesiastical province of the Metropolitan Archbishop of Porto Velho (Rondônia), in the upper Amazon River basin).

Its cathedral episcopal see is the Marian Catedral Nossa Senhora de Nazaré, dedicated to Our Lady of Nazareth, in the city of Rio Branco, Acre state, Brazil.

History 
On 4 October 1919, Pope Benedict XV established the Territorial Prelature of Acre and Purus (Italian Acre e Purus), named after the Amazonian rivers Acre and Purus, on canonical territory split off from the then Diocese of Amazonas.
 
Pope Pius XI changed the name of the prelature to the Territorial Prelature of São Peregrino Laziosi no Alto Acre e Alto Purus on 10 December 1926, but its original name was restored on 26 April 1958 by Pope Pius XII.

The territorial prelature was elevated to a bishopric and hence renamed after its see as Diocese of Rio Branco by Saint John Paul II on 15 February 1986.

Statistics 
As per 2014, it pastorally serves 443,000 Catholics (75.1% of 589,625 total) on 104,473 km2 in 32 parishes and 5 missions with 33 priests (23 diocesan, 10 religious), 22 deacons, 105 lay religious (19 brothers, 86 sisters) and 18 seminarians.

Ordinaries 
(all Roman Rite)

Territorial Bishop-Prelates of Acre and Purus 
 Geraldo Van Caloen, O.S.B. (12 March 1906 13 Dec 1907 (resigned)), Titular Bishop of Phocæa (12 March 1906 16 January 1932 (died)); later Abbot nullius of Nossa Senhora do Monserrate do Rio de Janeiro (Brazil) (13 December 1907 18 May 1915)
 Próspero Gustavo Bernardi, Servite Order (O.S.M.) (15 December 1919 10 December 1926 (see below)), Titular Bishop of Paltus (15 December 1919 1 February 1944 (died))

Territorial Bishop-Prelates of São Peregrino Laziosi no Alto Acre e Alto Purus 
 Próspero M. Gustavo Bernardi, (O.S.M.) ((see above) 10 December 1926 1 February 1944 (died)) 
''Apostolic Administrator Father Antônio Julio Maria Mattioli, Society of Mary (S.M.) (1941 10 January 1948 (see below))
 Antônio Julio Maria Mattioli, O.S.M. ((see above) 10 January 1948 13 April 1962 (see below)), Titular Bishop of Lacedæmonia (10 January 1948 13 April 1962 (died))

Territorial Bishop-Prelates of Acre and Purus 
 Antônio Julio Maria Mattioli, S.M. ((see above) 26 April 1958 13 April 1962 (died))
 Giocondo Maria Grotti, O.S.M. (16 November 1962 28 September 1971 (died)), Titular Bishop of Thunigaba (8 July 1965 28 September 1971)
 Moacyr Grechi, O.S.M. (10 July 1972 15 February 1986 (see below)), Titular Bishop of Vegesela in Numidia (20 July 1973 26 May 1978 (died))

Suffragan Bishops of Rio Branco 
 Moacyr Grechi, O.S.M. ((see above) 15 February 1986 29 July 1998), next Archbishop of Rio Branco's Metropolitan see Porto Velho (Brazil) (29 July 1998 30 November 2011 (retired))
 Joaquín Pertíñez Fernández, Order of Augustinian Recollects (O.A.R.) (24 February 1999 present), no prior office

See also 
 List of Catholic dioceses in Brazil

References

Sources and external links 
 GCatholic

Roman Catholic dioceses in Brazil
Roman Catholic Ecclesiastical Province of Porto Velho
Rio Branco
Roman Catholic dioceses and prelatures established in the 20th century
Religious organizations established in 1919